Stilicho's Pictish War is a name given to a war between the forces of the Western Roman Empire led by Stilicho and the Picts in Britain around 398 AD. Little is known about the conflict. The only real source is the panegyric In Eutropium by Claudian which indicates that while Stilicho was dealing with the Gildonic revolt in Africa, Britain suffered from attacks by the Saxons, Picts and Scots, and ended with "the Saxon conquered, the Ocean calmed, the Pict broken, and Britain secure." Another poem by Claudian refers to a possible expedition to Britain by Stilicho in 396-398.

It has been surmised that the Picts attacked the northern frontier of Britain but were defeated. In 400 Stilicho seems to have ordered repairs to Hadrian's Wall.

References

Wars involving the Roman Empire
390s in the Roman Empire
4th century in Scotland
398